Nimbahera is a town and a municipality in Chittorgarh district in the Indian state of Rajasthan.
Nimbahera is connected through both rail and road; it lies on the railway line connecting Ajmer to Ratlam.

Nimbaheda has significant population of mewati community

Geography

Demographics
 census, Nimbahera had a population of 78,123. In Nimbahera, 19% of the population is under 6 years of age.

Economy
Nimbahera is known for Nimbahera stone, a kind of limestone used as a building material and raw material in cement manufacturing, thus making it a suitable destination for cement industries and a good source of employment. Nimbahera has four cement plants, JK Cement nimbahera & Mangrol, Wonder Cement, and Nuvoco cement. Wonder Cement set up its first plant with a capacity of 3 million tonnes per annum.

References

Cities and towns in Chittorgarh district